Moramanga is a city (commune urbaine) in Madagascar. It is located in the region Alaotra-Mangoro and the Moramanga District.
It has a population of 57084 inhabitants (2018).

It is situated between the capital Antananarivo and the east coast on the crossroad of RN 2 and RN 44.
The name of Moranmanga originates from the slave trade. To differ them from other social classes, they were dressed in blue or manga.
As they were among the cheapest (mora) in Africa, it became Moramanga.

People
Moramanga is also the capital city of the Bezanozano people (one of the eighteen Ethnic groups of Madagascar).

Geography 
Moramanga is situated on a plateau between the central highlands and the east coast.

Transports 
The national road RN 2 connects the city with Antananarivo (115 km) and Toamasina (254 km), the Route nationale 44 to Ambatondrazaka (157 km), Imerimandroso and Amboavory.

The city is at the TCE (Tananarive-Côte Est) and the south end of the MLA (Moramanga-Lac Alaotra) railways, so it's the only railway junction in Madagascar (except for the capital).

Economy
The nickel and cobalt mine of Ambatovy is situated near this town.
Usine Militaire de Moramanga: Near Moramanga (Ambohibary) is situated the only armament factory of Madagascar.

History
The city of Moramanga has an important place in the history of Madagascar. It was in Moramanga, on the night of the 29th of March 1947 that the Malagasy Uprising against French colonial rule started.

Religion
 FJKM - Fiangonan'i Jesoa Kristy eto Madagasikara (Church of Jesus Christ in Madagascar)
 FLM - Fiangonana Loterana Malagasy (Malagasy Lutheran Church)
 Roman Catholic Diocese of Moramanga (Cathedral of the Sacred Heart of Jesus).
 FFPM - (United Pentecostal Church of Madagascar)
 Fiangonana Miara Manompo Moramanga
 EEM Eklesia Episkopaly Malagasy (Anglican Church of Madagascar)
 Eglise Rhema Terre de Sel

Education
Moramanga disposes of 167 primary schools, 17 secondary schools and 1 Lycée.

Furthermore the superior school of the Gendarmerie (Ecole Supérieure de la Gendarmerie) is also situated at Moramanga.

Health
20 dispensaries and 1 hospital is found in the city. Furthermore 2 dentists.

Sports
 AS Fanalamanga, Moramanga (football)

Wildlife
Protected areas near Moramanga are:

See also 

 Railway stations in Madagascar

References 

Cities in Madagascar
Populated places in Alaotra-Mangoro